Sybil is a 1976 two-part, -hour American made-for-television film starring Sally Field and Joanne Woodward. It is based on the book of the same name, and was broadcast on NBC on November 14–15, 1976.

Plot

After suffering a small breakdown in front of her students (and then being forced to hear a neighbor play Chopin's Étude in A Minor, "Winter Wind", incessantly), Sybil Dorsett is given a neurological examination by Dr. Cornelia Wilbur, a psychiatrist. She admits to having blackouts and fears that they are getting worse. Dr. Wilbur theorizes that the incidents are a kind of hysteria, all related to a deeper problem. She asks Sybil to return at a later date for more counseling. Sybil says she will have to ask her father.

Sybil's father, Willard Dorsett, and her stepmother, Freida, are in New York on a visit. Sybil meets them at a cafeteria for lunch. She explains to her father that the problems she used to have as a young girl have returned and that she wants to see a psychiatrist, Dr. Wilbur. Sybil's parents make it clear to Sybil that they disapprove of psychiatry. Sybil becomes upset and dissociates into Peggy, who becomes enraged and breaks a glass. Peggy angrily storms out of the cafeteria. Later that evening, Dr. Wilbur receives a late night call from someone who identifies herself as Vickie and says Sybil is about to jump out a hotel window. Dr. Wilbur rescues Sybil, who denies knowing Vickie. Suddenly, Sybil becomes hysterical and begins speaking like a young girl. This girl introduces herself as Peggy, and Wilbur realizes that Sybil is suffering from multiple personality disorder (now known as dissociative identity disorder).

Vickie introduces herself to Wilbur at the next session. Vickie, who knows everything about the other personalities, tells Wilbur about some of them, including Marcia, who is suicidal, and Vanessa, who plays the piano although Sybil has not played in years and swears she has forgotten how to play piano.

Over the weeks, each of the personalities introduces herself to Wilbur. At the same time, the personality Vanessa falls in love with a charming neighbor named Richard.

Wilbur finally explains to Sybil about the other personalities. As proof, Wilbur plays the session's tape to allow Sybil to hear their voices, but when a voice that sounds like Sybil's mother Hattie speaks, an infant personality named Ruthie emerges. Wilbur is unable to communicate with the pre-verbal child and must wait until Sybil returns.

Life becomes more chaotic for Sybil as the other personalities grow stronger. The personalities make Dr. Wilbur a Christmas card, but Sybil made everything purple, a color that frightens Peggy. Dr. Wilbur hypnotizes Vickie and asks about the purple. Vickie relates a memory of a time Sybil's mother locked young Sybil in the wheat bin in the barn. Thinking she was smothering, Sybil used her purple crayon to scratch on the inside of the bin so someone would know she had been there.

Vanessa invites Richard and his son Matthew to have Christmas dinner, after which Richard spends the night in Sybil's apartment. Sybil has a nightmare and awakens as Marcia, who tries to throw herself off the roof. Richard rescues her and calls Wilbur. Soon afterwards, Richard moves away, crushing both Sybil and Vanessa. Once again confronted with her diagnosis, Sybil attempts to convince Wilbur that she has in fact been faking all of the other personalities the entire time and denies that multiple personalities exist within her.

Wilbur goes in search of Sybil's father, who mentions that Sybil's mother Hattie was diagnosed with paranoid schizophrenia but denies that she ever abused Sybil. Wilbur also seeks out Sybil's pediatrician. The doctor gives Wilbur a frightening account of extensive internal scarring he found while treating Sybil for a bladder problem. Finally, Wilbur visits the old Dorsett house, where she discovers the green kitchen Sybil's selves have described many times. She also finds the purple crayon scratches inside the wheat bin. She takes them back to New York City to prove all the memories really happened.

Dr. Wilbur takes Sybil for a drive, during which Peggy reveals the horrific physical abuse she suffered at her mother's hands. After Peggy exhausts herself, Sybil emerges, remembering everything that Peggy has just said. Finally, she is able to express her rage against her mother.

Dr. Wilbur hypnotizes Sybil to introduce her to the other personalities. Sybil, who has always been frightened of Peggy, meets her at last and is surprised that she is only a young girl. Sybil embraces a weeping Peggy. A voiceover from Dr. Wilbur explains that after this incident, Sybil recovered her memories and went on to live a full and happy life as an academic.

Cast

 Joanne Woodward as Dr. Cornelia Wilbur
 Sally Field as Sybil Dorsett
 Brad Davis as Richard, Sybil's neighbor boyfriend
 Martine Bartlett as Hattie Dorsett, Sybil's mother
 Penelope Allen as Miss Penny
 Jane Hoffman as Frieda Dorsett
 Charles Lane as Dr. Quinoness
 Jessamine Milner as Grandma Dorsett
 William Prince as Willard Dorsett
 Camila Ashland as Cam
 Tommy Crebbs as Matthew
 Gina Petrushka as Dr. Lazarus
 Harold Pruett as Danny
 Natasha Ryan as Child Sybil
 Paul Tulley as Dr. Castle
 Anne Beesley as The Selves
 Virginia Campbell as The Selves
 Missy Karn as The Selves
 Tasha Lee as The Selves
 Cathy Lynn Lesko as The Selves
 Rachel Longaker as The Selves
 Jennifer McAllister as The Selves
 Kerry Muir as The Selves
 Karen Obediear as The Selves
 Tony Sherman as The Selves
 Danny Stevenson as The Selves
 Gordon Jump as Tractor farmer
 Lionel Pina as Tommy

The Alters
Peggy: A nine-year-old girl who believes she is still in the small town in which Sybil grew up. Peggy holds the rage Sybil felt at her mother's abuse and frequently expresses her anger through temper tantrums and breaking glass. Like many of the selves, she enjoys drawing and painting. She fears hands, dishtowels, music, and the colors green and purple, all triggers to specific instances of abuse.
Vickie: A very sophisticated and mature eighteen-year-old girl who is aware of all the other personalities and knows everything the others do, though Sybil does not. Vicky speaks French and claims to have grown up in Paris with many brothers and sisters and loving parents. The dominant personality and the only personality to undergo hypnosis.
Vanessa: A young, vibrant, red-haired girl about twelve years old, she is outgoing and full of "joie de vivre". Falls in love with Richard and helps Sybil build a relationship with him, until he moves away.
Marcia: A young girl obsessed with thoughts of death and suicide, who tries to kill herself (and thus Sybil) on several occasions. Dresses in black.
Ruthie: A preverbal infant. When Sybil is extremely frightened, she regresses into Ruthie and cannot move or speak.
Mary: Named for and strongly resembles Sybil's grandmother. When Sybil's grandmother (the only person Sybil felt loved her) died, Sybil was so bereft that she created Mary as an internalized version of Grandma. Mary speaks in the voice of an old woman and frequently behaves as one.
Nancy: A product of Sybil's father's religious fanaticism, Nancy fears the end of the world and God's punishment.
Clara: Around 8–9 years old. Very religious; critical and resentful of Sybil.
Helen: Around 13–14 years old. Timid and afraid, but determined "to be somebody".
Marjorie: Around 10–11 years old. Serene and quick to laugh, enjoys parties and travel.
Sybil Ann: Around 5–6 years old. Pale, timid, and extremely lethargic; the defeated Sybil.
Mike: A brash young boy who likes to build and do carpentry. He builds bookshelves and a partition wall for Sybil's apartment, frightening her badly when she doesn't know how they got there. He and Sid both believe that they will grow a penis and be able "to give a girl a baby" when they're older.
Sid: Younger and a little more taciturn than Mike, he also enjoys building things, as well as sports. Identifies strongly with Sybil's father and wants to be like him when he grows up.

Production
Sally Field stars in the title role, with Joanne Woodward playing the part of Sybil's psychiatrist, Cornelia B. Wilbur. Woodward herself had starred in The Three Faces of Eve, in which she portrayed a woman with three personalities, winning the Academy Award for Best Actress for the role. Based on the book Sybil by Flora Rheta Schreiber, the movie dramatizes the life of a shy young graduate student, Sybil Dorsett (in real life, Shirley Ardell Mason), suffering from dissociative identity disorder as a result of the psychological trauma she suffered as a child. With the help of her psychiatrist, Sybil gradually recalls the severe child abuse that led to the development of 16 different personalities. Field's portrayal of Sybil won much critical acclaim, as well as an Emmy Award.

Edited and unedited versions
The film, originally 198 minutes long, was initially shown over the course of two nights on NBC in 1976. Due to high public interest, the VHS version of Sybil was released in the 1980s, with one version running 122 minutes and another, extended version running 132 minutes. Several key scenes, including Sybil's final climactic "introduction" to her other personalities, are missing in both versions. The film is shown frequently on television, often with scenes restored or deleted to adjust for time constraints and the varying sensitivity of viewers. The DVD includes the full 198-minute version originally displayed on the NBC broadcast.

A 128-minute edit of the film was shown in cinemas in Australia, opening in January 1978.

Awards and nominations

See also
 Shirley Ardell Mason, the real-life patient upon whom the book and film are based

Notes

References

External links

Multiple Personality Controversies Links to many articles about the real Sybil, Shirley Mason.

1976 films
1976 television films
1977 television awards
1976 drama films
American drama television films
Films about dissociative identity disorder
American docudrama films
Emmy Award-winning programs
Films scored by Leonard Rosenman
Films about child abuse
Films about psychiatry
American films based on actual events
Films directed by Daniel Petrie
Films set in New York City
NBC network original films
Peabody Award-winning broadcasts
Films with screenplays by Stewart Stern
1970s American films
Films about disability
1970s English-language films